Dermoxanthus is a genus of leaf beetles in the subfamily Eumolpinae. It is distributed in Africa.

Species
 Dermoxanthus alternans Weise, 1909
 Dermoxanthus bicolor Weise, 1919
 Dermoxanthus brancuccii Zoia, 2010
 Dermoxanthus camerunensis Burgeon, 1941
 Dermoxanthus clavareaui Burgeon, 1941
 Dermoxanthus conjunctus Weise, 1902
 Dermoxanthus fraternus Baly, 1859
 Dermoxanthus fulvus Baly, 1859
 Dermoxanthus gedyei Bryant, 1958
 Dermoxanthus hunti Bryant, 1958
 Dermoxanthus kapiriensis Burgeon, 1941
 Dermoxanthus macinnesi Bryant, 1958
 Dermoxanthus maynei Burgeon, 1941
 Dermoxanthus monardi Pic, 1940
 Dermoxanthus montanus Bryant, 1958
 Dermoxanthus piceipes Zoia, 2017
 Dermoxanthus ruficolor Pic, 1953
 Dermoxanthus spinipes Lefèvre, 1877
 Dermoxanthus sulcipennis Weise, 1902
 Dermoxanthus vittatus Zoia, 2010

References

Eumolpinae
Chrysomelidae genera
Beetles of Africa
Taxa named by Joseph Sugar Baly